Safheh-ye Do (also Romanized as Şafḩeh-ye Do; also known as Şafḩeh) is a village in Esmailiyeh Rural District, in the Central District of Ahvaz County, Khuzestan Province, Iran. At the 2006 census, its population was 555, in 89 families.

References 

Populated places in Ahvaz County